Eleazar or Elʽazar was a priest in the Hebrew Bible, the second High Priest, succeeding his father Aaron after he died. He was a nephew of Moses.

Biblical narrative
Eleazar played a number of roles during the course of the Exodus, from creating the plating for the altar from the firepans of Korah's assembly, to performing the ritual of the red heifer. After the death of his older brothers Nadab and Abihu, he and his younger brother Ithamar were appointed to the charge of the sanctuary. His wife, a daughter of Putiel, bore him Phinehas, who would eventually succeed him as High Priest.

Leviticus 10:16–18 records an incident when Moses was angry with Eleazar and Ithamar, for failing to eat a sin offering inside the Tabernacle in accordance with the regulations set out in the preceding chapters of Leviticus regarding the entitlement of the priests to a share of the offerings they made on behalf of the Israelite people.

As the Israelites moved through the wilderness during the Exodus journey, Eleazar was responsible for carrying the oil for the lampstand, the sweet incense, the daily grain offering and the anointing oil, and also for oversight of the carriage of the Ark of the Covenant, table for showbread, altar and other tabernacle fittings which were transported by the Kohathite section of the Levite tribe. Following the rebellion against Moses' leadership recorded in Numbers 16, Eleazar was charged with taking the rebels' bronze censers and hammering them into a covering for the altar, to act as a reminder of the failed rebellion and the restriction of the priesthood to the Aaronid dynasty.

On Mount Hor he was clothed with the sacred vestments, which Moses took from his father Aaron and put upon him as successor to his father in the high priest's office, before Aaron's death. Eleazar held the office of high priest for more than twenty years. He took part with Moses in numbering the people, and assisted at the inauguration of Joshua.

He assisted in the distribution of the land after the conquest. When he died, he "was buried at Gibeah, which had been allotted to his son Phinehas in the hill country of Ephraim". The Hill of Phinehas related in the Bible is associated with the location of the village of Awarta in the Samarian section of the current day West Bank.

The high-priesthood remained in the family of Eleazar until the time of Eli, into whose family it passed. Eli was a descendant of Ithamar, Eleazar's brother. The high priesthood was restored to the family of Eleazar in the person of Zadok after Abiathar was cast out by Solomon.

Commemorations
Eleazar is commemorated as a saint in the Eastern Orthodox Church and Roman Catholic Church on September 2, and as one of the Holy Forefathers in the Calendar of Saints of the Armenian Apostolic Church on July 30.

Other biblical figures named Eleazar
Five other men named Eleazar are briefly mentioned in the Hebrew Bible:

 Eleazar, son of Abinadab, who was entrusted as a keeper of the Ark of the Covenant
 Eleazar (son of Dodai), one of King David's warriors
 Eleazar, son of Pinhas, one of those in charge of the sacred vessels brought back to Jerusalem after the Babylonian Exile.
 Eleazar, called Avaran who slays a battle elephant in I Maccabees.
 Eleazar, the Hebrew scribe whose martyrdom under Antiochus IV Epiphanes was recounted in II Maccabees.

In the Gospel of Matthew, another Eleazar, the son of Eliud, is listed in the genealogy of Jesus as the great-grandfather of Joseph, husband of Mary.

Patrilineal ancestry

References

External links
 Lives of the saints - Righteous Eleazar, Macedonian Orthodox Church website
 , Roman Catholic Church website

High Priests of Israel
Christian saints from the Old Testament
Family of Aaron